Prince Sahibzada Sayyid Shareef Ghulam Muhammad Sultan Khan Sahib,  (March 1795 in Srirangapatnam – 11 August 1872 in Russapagla, Calcutta) was the fourteenth son of Tipu Sultan.

Deported to Calcutta in 1806 along with the remainder of his family 7 years after the defeat and death of his father, he was eventually recognised by the Government of India as the official head of the family and successor to his father.

Known as the last surviving son of Tipu Sultan and Knighted in 1870, he died 2 years later, aged of 77, of dengue fever.

Sources

References

History of Karnataka
Knights Commander of the Order of the Star of India
Indian knights
1795 births
1872 deaths
Deaths from dengue fever
Tipu Sultan